Kashif is the self-titled fifth studio album by American singer Kashif. It was released by Arista Records in 1989. The album includes two hit singles, "Personality" and a cover of the 1973 hit "Ain't No Woman (Like the One I've Got)" by The Four Tops. This was the last studio album from Kashif for Arista Records.

Track listing

Personnel 
 Kashif – lead vocals, backing vocals, keyboards (1, 2, 6, 8, 9), drum programming (1, 2, 6, 8, 9), all instruments (3, 4, 5), Synclavier programming (4)
 Nick Mundy – keyboards (1, 2, 6, 8), drum programming (1, 2, 6, 8), backing vocals (1, 2, 6, 8)
 Taharqa Aleem – all instruments (5)
 Tunde-Ra Aleem – all instruments (5)
 Steve Lindsey – keyboards (6, 9)
 Monty Seward – keyboards (6, 7, 9), drum programming (6)
 Curtis Dowd – keyboards (7), drum programming (7)
 Nick Moroch – guitars (3)
 Ira Siegel – guitars (3)
 Randy Bowland – guitars (7), bass (7)
 Ray Fuller – guitars (7)
 Victor Bailey – bass (1), backing vocals (3)
 Allen McGrier – bass (4)
 Dwayne "Smitty" Smith – bass (7)
 Daniel Wilensky – saxophone solo (7)
 Prince Charles Alexander – Yamaha WX7 solo (9)
 Kim "Eurisa" Davis – backing vocals (1, 9)
 Sandra St. Victor – backing vocals (2, 3, 6, 8)
 Rick Oriol – party voice (2)
 Joi Cardwell – backing vocals (4)
 Leroy Burgess – backing vocals (5)
 Lori Fulton – backing vocals (7)
 Cindy Mizelle – backing vocals (8)

Technical and Design
 Prince Charles Alexander – recording (1-4, 6-9), mixing (1-4, 6, 8, 9)
 Earl Cohen – recording (3), mixing (3)
 Steve Goldman – recording (3, 5), mixing (5, 7)
 Oswald Bowe – assistant engineer (1)
 Tom Callahan – assistant engineer (1, 6)
 George Mayers Jr. – assistant engineer (1)
 Ernie Perez – assistant engineer (1, 2, 4, 6, 7, 8)
 Roy Sweeting – assistant engineer (1)
 Chris Furhman – assistant engineer (2, 4, 6, 8, 9), additional engineer (6, 7)
 Joel Iwataki – assistant engineer (2, 4, 6, 8)
 Mitchell Osias – assistant engineer (2)
 Alejandro Rodriguez – assistant engineer (2, 6, 7) 
 Kevin Thomas – assistant engineer (2, 6, 8, 9)
 Angela R. Dryden – assistant engineer (3, 5, 9)
 Dug Larsen – assistant engineer (3, 5, 9), additional engineer (5)
 Maurice Puerto – assistant engineer (3)
 Christopher Savino – assistant engineer (3)
 Vince Caro – assistant engineer (4, 6)
 Rob Harvey – assistant engineer (4)
 Robin Laine – assistant engineer (4, 6, 9)
 Ray Pyle – assistant engineer (6)
 Anthony Saunders – assistant engineer (7)
 Nick Els – assistant engineer (9)
 David Schober – additional engineer (6)
 Will Rogers – additional engineer (7)
 Adrian Salley – production coordinator
 David Brubaker – design 
 Adrian Buckmaster – photography 
 Eric Gold and The Gold Company – management

Charts

References

External links

Kashif (1989) at Discogs

1989 albums
Kashif (musician) albums